William George Harvey  (25 October 1892 — 14 September 1917) was an Australian rules footballer who played with Essendon in the Victorian Football League (VFL). During World War I he won the Military Cross and was killed in action in Belgium during the Battle of Passchendaele.

Footballer
Billy played with Ararat Football Club 1911, 8 games. Recruited from the Engineers, he played nine senior games for Essendon, and kicked two goals. His first match was against Geelong at the East Melbourne Cricket Ground,  on 25 May 1912 (round 5), in which he played well. His last match was against St Kilda, at the Junction Oval, on 24 August 1912.

Family
The son of Edward and Annie Harvey, née Gilpin, he was born in Canterbury, Victoria in 1892, and married Mona Madeleine Faragher, at Wandsworth, London on 18 October 1916.

Soldier
He enlisted in the First AIF, giving his occupation as carpenter, on 24 August 1914.

Death
Captain William George Harvey, M.C., 1st Australian Pioneers, was killed in action at the age of 25 on 14 September 1917.

See also
 List of Victorian Football League players who died in active service

Footnotes

External links

 World War I Service Record: William George Harvey
 Roll of Honour - William George Harvey
 Honours and Awards: Notification of Award: Captain William George Harvey, M.C.
 Honours and Awards: Military Cross Citation: Captain William George Harvey.
 Died on Service: Harvey, The Argus, (Monday, 24 September 1917), p.1. 
 Died on Service: Harvey, The Argus, (Thursday, 27 September 1917), p.1.
 Died on Service: Harvey, The Argus, (Saturday, 29 September 1917), p.1.
 Australian Casualties: Lis No.341: Victoria: Killed in Action (Harvey, Captain W. G., Canterbury, 14/9/17), The Argus, (Saturday, 13 October 1917), p.19.

1892 births
1917 deaths
Australian rules footballers from Melbourne
Essendon Football Club players
Australian military personnel killed in World War I
Australian recipients of the Military Cross
People from Canterbury, Victoria
Military personnel from Melbourne